Tazeh Kand-e Qarajeh Qayah (also known as Tāzeh Kand-e Qezel Dāgh and Tāzeh Kand-e Qezel Dāghī) is a village in Nazarkahrizi Rural District, Nazarkahrizi District, Hashtrud County, East Azerbaijan Province, Iran. At the 2006 census, its population was 142, in 27 families.

References 

Towns and villages in Hashtrud County